Undisclosed is a podcast about wrongful convictions in the United States. It is hosted by Rabia Chaudry, Susan Simpson, and Colin Miller. Rabia Chaudry started it with fellow attorneys Susan Simpson and Colin Miller. The podcast started by investigating the conviction of Adnan Syed for the killing of Hae Min Lee, which had previously been the focus of the first season of the podcast Serial. 

Season two focused on the Georgia conviction of Joey Watkins for the murder of Isaac Dawkins, which, according to Undisclosed, was wrongful. According to the podcast, Watkins' cell phone records proved that he could not have committed the murder, because they showed that when the murder occurred, he was indeed on the divided highway where it happened, but going in the opposite direction, with a location constrained by the cell tower pinged by a call he made. According to the podcast, turning around before firing the shot would have required him to drive impossibly fast along the busy highway, recognize Dawkins' vehicle going the opposite direction in the dark, then turn around before he or a passenger fired the fatal shot.

The podcast released its final episode in March 2022.

Undisclosed LLC v. State
Undisclosed wanted to copy the tapes from the Watkins trial, which they wanted to play so that listeners could hear Watkins saying he was innocent. The court initially agreed, then changed its mind before they actually copied the tapes. This led to further litigation, with the Georgia Supreme Court eventually ruling that the state did not have to allow Undisclosed to copy the tapes.

Seasons
Undisclosed has covered many cases over twenty-four seasons, but there are occasionally bonus episodes, addendum episodes, updates, or episodes between seasons.

Season titles
Season One: The State v. Adnan Syed
Season Two: The State v. Joey Watkins
Season Three: The State v. Jamar Huggins
Season Four: The Killing of Freddie Gray
Season Five: The State v. Gary Mitchum Reeves
Season Six: The State v. Shaurn Thomas
Season Seven: The State v. Willie Veasy
Season Eight: The State v. Terrance Lewis
Season Nine: The State v. Chester Holman III
Season Ten: The State v. Ronnie Long
Season Eleven: The State v. Pamela Lanier
Season Twelve: The State v. Dennis Perry
Season Thirteen: The Case Against Adnan Syed
Season Fourteen: State v. Keith Davis, Jr.
Season Fifteen: State v. Rocky Meyers
Season Sixteen: State v. Joseph Webster
Season Seventeen: State v. Greg Lance
Season Eighteen: State v. Fred Freeman
Season Nineteen: State v. Jonathan Irons
Season Twenty: State v. John Brookins
Season Twenty-One: State v. Jeff Titus
Season Twenty-Two: State v. Darrell Ewing
Season Twenty-Three: State v. Jason Carroll
Season Twenty-Four: State v. Willis and Braddy.

Media 
Timber Media Profile
Nieman Lab article that uses Undisclosed as a backdrop against other true crime podcasts

See also
List of American crime podcasts
Serial (podcast)
Killing of Hae Min Lee
Adnan Syed

References

External links

Audio podcasts
Crime podcasts
Infotainment
2015 podcast debuts
American podcasts